This is the discography for American electronic musician Dave Audé.

Albums 
 Audacious (2006)
 2 Audacious (2009)
 Audacious 3 (2011)
 Audacious Summer 2011 Sampler (2011)
 Audacious 4 (2013)
 Audacious Summer Vol. 1 (2014)
 Audacious Vol. 5 (2016)
 Audacious Summer Vol. 2 (2017)
 Shiny Things (2021)
 Motions LP (2022)

Singles 
1996 "Stop/Go" (as D'Still'D)
1996 "Free/Lunatix" (in group Disfunktional)
1997 "L-O-V-E" (in group Disfunktional)
1999 "That Zipper Track" (as Needle Damage)
1999 "Push That Thing"
2000 "I Can't Wait"
2000 "Drowning" (as Cleveland Lounge)
2000 "Rush Hour"
2002 "I Don't Want Nobody" (as Jada)
2003 "The Zone" (as Extension 119)
2006 "Common Ground" (with Tall Paul and Sisely Treasure)
2007 "Make It Last" (with Jessica Sutta)
2008 "Grass Is Greener" (with Sisely Treasure)
2009 "Lie to Ourselves" (with Christopher Lawrence and Jen Lasher)
2010 "Figure It Out" (with Isha Coco)
2010 "Dancin' Circles" (with David Garcia and Sisely Treasure)
2011 "Holdin' On" (with Elijah)
2011 "That You Like" (with Sisely Treasure)
2011 "I'm Still Hot" (with Luciana)
2012 "Never Forget" (with Lena Katina of t.A.T.u.)
2012 "Something For The Weekend" (with Luciana)
2012 "Fiyacraka" (Writer and Producer) KORR-A
2013 "The Girl Can't Help It" Katia Nicole (Writer and Producer)
2013 "Hold Me" Yoko Ono (featuring Dave Audé)
2013 "Bullet" Rokelle (featuring Dave Audé)
2013 "Electricity & Drums (Bad Boy)" (featuring Akon and Luciana)
2013 "Hustlin'" (Crazibiza and Dave Audé featuring Vassy)
2013 "All Night" (Writer and Producer) Irina
2013 "Take Me Away" Rokelle (featuring Dave Audé)
2013 "Satellite" Justin Caruso and AUDÉ (featuring Christine Novelli)
2014 "Aftermath (Here We Go)" Dave Audé featuring Andy Bell
2014 "Love Come Down" (Writer and Producer) Ivan Gomez and Nacho Chapado featuring Vassy
2014 "You Only Talk in #hashtag" featuring Luciana
2014 "Tears" Justin Caruso and Dave Aude featuring Miss Palmer
2014 "Sweeter" featuring Porcelain Black
2014 "Tokyo Style" FUTURE BOYZ (featuring Dave Aude and Vassy)
2014 "Tomorrow Never Dies" (Producer) Gali
2014 "Believe" (Producer) Irina
2015 "Im Gonna Get You" featuring Jessica Sutta
2015 "Step It Up" RuPaul (featuring Dave Aude)
2015 "Te Quiero" Claydee (featuring Dave Aude) 
2015 "Circles" 
2015 "You Have to Believe" featuring Olivia Newton-John and Chloe Lattanzi
2015 "I'm Burning Up" Karine Hannah / Dave Aude
2016 "True Original" featuring Andy Bell
2016 "Love Me Like You Mean It" feat Kelsea Ballerini
2016 "Kill Em With Kindness" (Writer) Selena Gomez
2016 "Unwritten" Veronica Bravo (featuring Dave Aude)
2016 "Sweet Dreams" featuring Skylar Stecker (in group JX Riders)
2016 "Used to Love You" Smok3 Machin3s (Producer)
2016 "Back 2 Love" with JVMIE
2016 "Yeah Yeah" with Luciana
2017 "Willing to Beg" J Sutta (Producer)
2017 "Hiccup" featuring Sisterwife (in group JX Riders)
2017 "All the Rules" featuring Ben Thornewill
2017 "Love My People" with Crown and The M.O.B.
2018 "Perfect to Me" featuring King Brown
2018 "Flakka Flakka" with Will Sparks and Luciana
2019 "Pacman" featuring Sam Tinnesz
2020 "Watching You Watching Me" featuring Luciana
2020 "Coyote Ugly Megamix" with LeAnn Rimes
2021 "You Only Talk in Hashtag" (Dave Aude Remix) with Luciana
2021 "I'm Still Hot" (Dave Aude Remix) with Luciana
2021 "Only Us" Clayton Anderson (Writer and Producer)
2021 "Somewhere to Fall" Matt Goss (Writer and Producer)
2021 "Elevating Love" with Nicole Markson
2022 "This is Our Time" with Nick Clow
2022 "It's Your Body" with Nicole Markson
2022 "Show Me Your Fish" Clayton Anderson (Writer and Producer)
2022 "Break Out" with Jeffery James
2022 "Love Comes Once In Your Life" OMG Collective featuring Janice Robinson (Producer)
2022 "Believer" Nicole Markson (Producer)
2022 "This Is My House" with Nicole Markson
2022 "Neon Moon" with Cody Belew
2022 "Motions" with Zee Machine
2022 "Sun Meets the Water" Samantha Mera (Producer)
2022 "Indiana" Clayton Anderson (Writer and Producer)
2022 "Uninvited" with LeAnn Rimes
2022 "Never Too Late" Nicole Markson (Producer)
2022 "In the Air Tonight" with Nicole Markson
2023 "Only One" RoadHouse featuring DYSON (Producer)
2023 "Gotta Get Up" Clayton Anderson (Producer)

Remixes 
The following is an incomplete list of songs with official remixes released by Dave Audé, ordered by year:

1996 DJ Keoki – "Caterpillar"
1996 Elli Mac – "Celebrate" (Dave Aude Mad Mix)
1996 E.K.O. – "De La Casa" (as D'Still'D)
1996 Progression – "If You Believe" (in group Disfunktional)
1996 Kellee – "My Love '96" (as D'Still'D)
1996 Eden featuring Callaghan – "Lift Me" (Dave Aude Mad Mix)
1996 Dubstar – "Elevator Song" (as D'Still'D)
1996 Gypsy Queens – "Paradise" (as D'Still'D)
1996 Future Breeze – "Why Don't You Dance With Me" (as D'Still'D)
1997 Space - "Female of the Species" (as D'Still'D)
1997 Mighty Dub Katz – "It's Just Another Groove (I Think That We Should Get Back Together)" (in group Disfunktional)
1997 Discfunktional – "L-O-V-E"
1997 Tenth Chapter (Carl Cox) – "Prologue"
1997 Tall Paul – "Rock Da House" (as D'Still'D)
1997 Temple featuring Allen Hidalgo – "The Message"
1997 Deni Hines – "I Like The Way"
1998 Barenaked Ladies – "One Week"
1998 Sabrina Johnston - "Reasons" (with Mohamed Moretta)
1998 N'n'G featuring Kallaghan - "Right Before My Eyes"
1998 Orgy – "Blue Monday"
1998 Mystic 3 – "Something's Goin' On"
1998 Sparks - "The No. 1 Song In Heaven"
1998 Happy Rhodes – "Roy"
1999 Faith No More – "We Care A Lot"
1999 2 Eivissa – "Shattered Dreams"
1999 Radical Playaz – "The Hook"
1999 E.K.O. – "Keep It Shining"
1999 Freshmäka – "I Am The Freshmäka"
1999 Pat Hodges – "Rushin' To Meet You"
1999 Shawn Christopher – "Don't Lose The Magic"
1999 Shawn Christopher – "Sweet Freedom"
1999 Baby Blue – "Too Loud"
1999 Fifty Fifty – "Tonight (I'm Dreaming)"
2000 A Tribe Called Quest - "Public Enemy" (with DJ Dan)
2000 Elisha La'Verne - "Give Me A Reason"
2000 Snake River Conspiracy – "Breed"
2000 Cleveland Lounge – "Drowning"
2000 Tall Paul – "Freebase"
2000 Freshmaka – "La La La"
2000 CeCe Peniston – "Lifetime to Love" (as Mr Nice Guy)
2000 Yomanda – "On The Level"
2000 Everlasting Throbbing Poppers – "Pulsing"
2000 Mystic 3 – "Something's Goin' On"
2000 Vimana – "We Came"
2000 Madonna – "Don't Tell Me"
2000 Madonna – "Music"
2001 LeAnn Rimes – "I Need You"
2001 Ferry Corsten – "Punk" (in group Rich Kidz)
2001 Tall Paul – "It's Alright"
2001 DJ Keoki – "Relax"
2002 Tall Paul vs INXS - "Precious Heart" (in group Rich Kidz)
2002 Cirrus – "Boomerang" (in group Rich Kidz)
2002 Las Ketchup - "The Ketchup Song (Asereje)"
2002 t.A.T.u. – "All The Things She Said" (as Extension 119)
2002 Rose Moore - "Why / E Si Do Maya E Si"
2002 DJ Keoki – "Jealousy"
2003 Pink and William Orbit - "Feel Good Time"
2003 Fleetwood Mac - "Go Your Own Way"
2003 Michelle Branch - "Breathe"
2003 t.A.T.u. – "Not Gonna Get Us"
2003 t.A.T.u. – "30 Minutes" (as Extension 119)
2003 Baha Men – "Handle It"
2003 Enrique Iglesias featuringKelis – "Not in Love"
2003 Sting – "Send Your Love"
2003 Extension 119 – "The Zone"
2003 No Doubt – "It's My life"
2003 Becky Baeling – "Getaway" (as Extension 119)
2003 Annie Lennox – "Wonderful"
2003 GusGus - "David"
2004 Green Day - "Ringtones" (with DJ Dan)
2004 Big & Rich - "Save A Horse, Ride A Cowboy" (with DJ Dan)
2004 Ashlee Simpson - "Shadow"
2004 Argento – "Disco Geiger"
2004 Ono – "Everyman… Everywoman…"
2004 Nemesis - "Let Me Help You Out"
2004 TNT – "Dynamite (Theme From 'LA DJ')"
2004 Cherie – "Older Than My Years"
2004 Cherie – "I'm Ready"
2004 Sugababes – "Hole In the Head" (in group Dummies)
2005 Midori - "The Illusion"
2005 Britney Spears – "I'm A Slave 4 U" (for B In The Mix: The Remixes)
2005 Sting – "Stolen Car (Take Me Dancing)"
2005 t.A.T.u. – "All About Us"
2005 Gorillaz – "DARE"
2005 Pepper Mashay with Digital Trip – "Send Me An Angel"
2005 The Veronicas – "4ever" (as Claude le Gache)
2005 Alanis Morissette – "Crazy" (as Claude le Gache)
2005 Rob Thomas - "Ever The Same"
2005 Clear Static – "Make-Up Sex" (as Claude le Gache)
2005 The Pussycat Dolls – "Don't Cha" (with DJ Dan)
2005 Lindsay Lohan – "Confessions of a Broken Heart (Daughter to Father)"
2005 Yoko Ono – "Give Peace A Chance" (with DJ Dan)
2005 Crime Mob – "Steilettos (Pumps)"
2005 Depeche Mode – "Precious" (with DJ Dan)
2005 New Order – "Guilt Is A Useless Emotion" (with DJ Dan)
2005 New Order – "Krafty" (with DJ Dan)
2005 The Lovemakers - "Prepare For The Fight" (in group Dummies)
2005 Ringside – "Tired Of Being Sorry" (in group Dummies)
2005 Lunascape – "Mindstalking"
2005 Jojo – "Leave (Get Out)"
2005 Nikka Costa - "Til' I Get To You"
2005 Coldplay – "Talk"
2005 Head Automatica - "Beating Heart Baby"
2006 Gwen Stefani - "Wind It Up"
2006 +44 - "When Your Heart Stops Beating" (as Claude Le Gache)
2006 The Pussycat Dolls - "Stickwitu"
2006 Chelo – "Cha Cha"
2006 Beyoncé – "Upgrade U"
2006 Jamie Kennedy and Stu Stone – "Circle Circle Dot Dot"
2006 Jupiter Rising – "Go!"
2006 Jessica Vale – "Disco Libido"
2006 MYNC Project and Danny Rampling – "Strobelight"
2006 Paris Hilton – "Turn It Up" (with DJ Dan)
2006 Paris Hilton – "Turn You On" (as "Claude le Gache")
2006 Paris Hilton - "Nothing In This World"
2006 Robin – "The DJ Made Me Do It"
2006 KoЯn – "Politics" (as Claude le Gache)
2006 Nemesis – "Number One In Heaven"
2006 Mobile – "Out of My Head" (as Claude le Gache)
2006 Rock Kills Kid - "Paralyzed" (as Claude le Gache)
2006 The Veronicas – "Everything I'm Not" (as Claude le Gache)
2006 Nitelife - "Music Is The Answer" (with Tall Paul)
2006 Avant featuring Nicole Scherzinger - "Lie About Us"
2006 The Grates - "Silence Is Golden"
2007 Rooney - "When Did Your Heart Go Missing?" (as Claude le Gache)
2007 Nicole Scherzinger featuring will.i.am – "Baby Love"
2007 Nelly Furtado – "All Good Things (Come to an End)"
2007 Jessi Malay featuring Young Joc - "Booty Bangs" (with DJ Dan)
2007 Delerium - "Lost And Found" (with DJ Dan)
2007 Enrique Iglesias – "Do You Know? (The Ping Pong Song)" (with DJ Dan)
2007 Kimberley Locke – "Band Of Gold"
2007 Valeria featuring Aria – "Girl I Told Ya"
2007 Suite 117 – "Smaller"
2007 Kelly Clarkson- "Never Again"
2007 Jacinta – "Can't Keep It A Secret"
2007 Hilary Duff – "With Love" (with Richard Vission)
2007 Enrique Iglesias – "Escape"
2007 Enrique Iglesias – "Tired Of Being Sorry" (in group Dummies)
2007 Young Love – "Find A New Way"
2007 Yoko Ono – "You're the One" (as Claude Le Gache)
2007 Danity Kane – "Show Stopper"
2007 Stevie Nicks – "Stand Back"
2007 Gabriel & Dresden – "New Path" (featuring Jan Burton)
2007 Pussycat Dolls – "Buttons"
2007 Samantha Jade – "Eyes On Me"
2007 Kill Hannah - "Crazy Angel"
2007 Tiffany - "Just Another Day"
2007 Meck featuring Dino - "Feels Like Home"
2008 Inaya Day – "Say You Will"
2008 Hilary Duff – "Stranger" (with Richard Vission)
2008 DJ Timbo and Friends – "GoGo Girl"
2008 Blake Lewis – "How Many Words"
2008 Enrique Iglesias – "Away"
2008 Lady Gaga – "The Fame"
2008 KoЯn – "Evolution"
2008 Pussycat Dolls – "I Hate This Part"
2008 will.i.am – "One More Chance"
2008 Yoko Ono – "Give Peace A Chance"
2008 Danity Kane - "Bad Girl"
2008 Colette– "If"
2008 Ashlee Simpson – "Outta My Head (Ay Ya Ya)"
2008 Ashlee Simpson – "Little Miss Obsessive"
2008 Leana – "Embrace Me"
2008 Lady Gaga – "Poker Face"
2008 Lady Gaga – "LoveGame"
2008 Sultan & NedShepard featuring Kuba One – "Jeopardy"
2008 Beyoncé Knowles – "Single Ladies (Put a Ring on It)"
2008 The Pussycat Dolls – "When I Grow Up"
2008 Craig David – "Hot Stuff (Let's Dance)"
2008 Vinny Troia - "Magic"
2008 Janice Grace – "Wanna Be Beautiful"
2008 Girls Aloud – "The Promise"
2008 Girlicious – "Baby Doll"
2008 Girlicious – "Like Me"
2008 Girlicious – "Stupid Sh**"
2008 Donna Summer – "Fame (The Game)"
2008 Sir Ivan - "For What It's Worth"
2008 Lenna - "Elle Est Tres L.A."
2008 Sarah Atereth - "It Doesn't Take Much"
2008 Nikka Costa - "Stuck To You"
2008 Gina Star featuring Deanna – "Rock With Me"
2009 Ashley Tisdale  – "It's Alright, It's OK"
2009 Backstreet Boys – "Straight Through My Heart"
2009 Beyoncé Knowles – "Halo"
2009 Bad Boy Bill – "Do What U Like (feat. Alyssa Palmer)"
2009 Kelly Clarkson - "My Life Would Suck Without You"
2009 Mena Heaven – "Open Up Your Mind"
2009 Carmen Reece – "Right Here"
2009 Pussycat Dolls – "Bottle Pop"
2009 Chrisette Michele – "Epiphany"
2009 Dean Coleman featuring DCLA – "I Want You"
2009 Cinema Bizarre – "Lovesongs (They Kill Me)"
2009 Erika Jayne – "Give You Everything"
2009 Eva Simons – "Silly Boy"
2009 Heidi Montag – "More is More"
2009 Sean Kingston – "Fire Burning"
2009 Jackson 5 – "Dancing Machine" (with DJ Havana Brown)
2009 Janet Jackson – "Make Me"
2009 Jonas Brothers – "Paranoid"
2009 Julien-K – "Kick The Bass"
2009 La Roux – "Bulletproof"
2009 Lady Gaga – "Paparazzi"
2009 Mary Mary – "God In Me"
2009 New Boyz – "You're a Jerk"
2009 Mr Hudson featuring Kanye West – "Supernova"
2009 Noisettes – "Don't Upset The Rhythm"
2009 Oceana – "Body Rock"
2009 Paradiso Girls – "Patron Tequila"
2009 Plumb – "Hang On"
2009 Pussycat Dolls – "Hush Hush"
2009 Rob Zombie – "What"
2009 Diddy-Dirty Money - "Angels"
2009 U2 – "Magnificent"
2009 V Factory – "Love Struck"
2009 Matt Goss – "Evil"
2009 Yoko Ono – "I'm Not Getting Enough"
2009 Ysa Ferrer – "Last Zoom"
2009 Yulianna – "Racecar"
2009 Atom – "Satellite"
2009 Fans Of Jimmy Century – "Lola Like This"
2009 Esmee Denters – "Outta Here"
2009 Gia Bella – "Back It Up"
2009 Sun – "Fancy Free"
2009 Information Society – "Seeds Of Pain"
2009 Ralphi Rosario featuring Shawn Christoher – "Everybody Shake It"
2009 Serena Ryder - "Got Your Number"
2010 Vinny Troia featuring Jaidene Veda – "Magic"
2010 Erika Jayne – "Pretty Mess"
2010 Erika Jayne – "Sex Shooter"
2010 Lady Gaga – "Bad Romance"
2010 Selena Gomez & The Scene – "Naturally"
2010 Yoko Ono – "Give Me Something"
2010 Lara Fabian – "Toutes les Femmes En Moi" (English and French)
2010 Charice – "Pyramid"
2010 Black Gold – "Shine"
2010 Iyaz – "Solo"
2010 Nadine Coyle – "Put Your Hands Up"
2010 Vinny Troia – "Do For Love"
2010 The Disco Biscits – "On Time"
2010 Mary J. Blige – "I Am"
2010 Kelis – "Acapella"
2010 Goldfrapp – "Alive"
2010 OneRepublic – "All The Right Moves"
2010 Lady Gaga – "Alejandro
2010 Alexis Jordan – "Happiness"
2010 Taio Cruz featuring Ke$ha – "Dirty Picture"
2010 Ke$ha – "Your Love Is My Drug"
2010 Rihanna – "Rockstar 101"
2010 Carmen Reece – Raindrop
2010 Vinny Troia featuring Jaidene Veda – "Do For Love"
2010 Ecotek – "Into The Night"
2010 Zayra – "V.I.P."
2010 Sarah McLachlan – "Loving You is Easy"
2010 Kaci Battaglia – '"Body Shots"
2010 Charice – "I Love You"
2010 Selena Gomez & The Scene – "Round & Round"
2010 Katy Perry – "Teenage Dream"
2010 Giulietta (singer) – "Vertigo"
2010 Yoko Ono – "Wouldnit (I'm a Star)"
2010 Paradiso Girls – "Who's My Bitch"
2010 Plumb – "Beautiful History"
2010 Beach Girls 5 – "Scratch"
2010 BT –  "The Emergency"
2010 Richard Vission and Static Revenger and Luciana – "I Like That"
2010 J786 – "Rock Tonight"
2010 Nicole Scherzinger – "Poison"
2010 Cher – "You Haven't Seen the Last of Me"
2010 The Black Eyed Peas – "The Time (Dirty Bit)"
2010 Erika Jayne – "One Hot Pleasure"
2010 Ke$ha – "Animal"
2010 Natasha Bedingfield – "Strip Me"
2010 Selena Gomez & The Scene – "A Year Without Rain"
2010 Nadine Coyle – "Hands Up"
2011 J786 – "Outtacontrol"
2010 Edei – "In My Bed"
2011 Rihanna – "S&M"
2011 Katy Perry featuring Kanye West – "E.T"
2011 LeAnn Rimes – "Crazy Women"
2011 Sultan & Ned Shepard featuring Nadia Ali – "Call My Name"
2011 Ono – "Move on Fast"
2011 Jennifer Hudson – "Where You At"
2011 Wanessa – "Stuck On Repeat"
2011 Andrea Rosario – "We Own The Night"
2011 Selena Gomez & The Scene – "Who Says"
2011 Jennifer Lopez featuring Lil Wayne – "I'm Into You"
2011 Lady Gaga – "Judas"
2011 Innerpartysystem – "Not Getting Any Better"
2011 Beyoncé – "Run The World (Girls)"
2011 Frankmusik featuring Far East Movement – "Do It in the AM"
2011 Christian TV – "I'm In Love"
2011 Mayra Veronica – "Freak Like Me"
2011 Blush featuring Snoop Dogg – "Undivided"
2011 Nicole Scherzinger – "Don't Hold Your Breath"
2011 Lil Larry – "Beautiful Thing"
2011 Bera – "Favourite Things"
2011 Digital Freq and Lizzie Curious – "Last Train To Nowhere"
2011 Colette Carr – "(We Do It) Primo"
2011 Yoko Ono – "Talking to the Universe"
2011 Jessica Sutta – "Show Me"
2011 NERVO – "We're All No One"
2011 Luciana – "I'm Still Hot"
2011 KoЯn – "Narcissistic Cannibal" (featuring Skrillex and Kill The Noise)
2011 Guinevere – "Crazy Crazy"
2011 Selena Gomez & The Scene – "Love You Like a Love Song"
2011 Blush – "Dance On"
2011 Micro vs. Dhany - "On Your Road"
2011 Paris and Destinee – "True Love"
2011 Bera – "Light It Up"
2011 Rihanna – "You Da One"
2011 Audio Playground – "Famous"
2011 Neon Hitch – "Fuck U Betta"
2011 Carishma – "Glow In The Dark"
2011 will.i.am feat Mick Jagger and Jennifer Lopez – "T.H.E."
2011 Diddy-Dirty Money feat Skylar Grey - "Coming Home"
2011 Derek Bramble featuring Amanda - "Escape"
2011 Nesty La Mente Maestra featuring Isha Coco "Latin Flow (Drive)"
2012 Eva – "Body On Mine"
2012 Coldplay – "Charlie Brown"
2012 Lena Katina – "Never Forget"
2012 Adam Lambert – "Better Than I Know Myself"
2012 Carishma – "Like A Rainbow"
2012 China Anne McClain – "Unstoppable"
2012 Yoko Ono – "She Gets Down on Her Knees"
2012 Madonna – "Girl Gone Wild"
2012 One Direction – "What Makes You Beautiful"
2012 Tammy Wynette – "Stand By Your Man"
2012 Erika Jayne – "United"
2012 Morel – "I'm So Low"
2012 Selena Gomez & The Scene – "Hit The Lights"
2012 Blush – "All Stars"
2012 Yoko Ono – "I'm Moving On"
2012 Taryn Manning – "Send Me Your Love"
2012 Midnight Red – "Hell Yeah"
2012 Wonder Girls featuring Akon – "Like Money"
2012 Jeffree Star – "Prom Night!"
2012 Audio Playground – "Emergency"
2012 Frenchie Davis – "Love's Got A Hold On Me"
2012 Mandy Capristo - "The Way I Like It"
2012 One Direction – "Live While We're Young"
2012 Conor Maynard featuring Ne-Yo – "Turn Around"
2012 Kreayshawn – "Go Hard"
2012 Paloma Faith – "Picking Up the Pieces"
2012 Chris Brown – "Don't Judge Me"
2012 Tanlines – "All Of Me"
2012 Vassy – "We Are Young"
2012 Rihanna – "Diamonds"
2012 Havana Brown – "Big Banana"
2012 Cherry Cherry Boom Boom – "One and Only"
2012 Kwanza Jones – "Supercharged"
2012 Penguin Prison - "Don't Fuck With My Money"
2012 Irina – "Something About You"
2012 Irina – "Believe"
2012 will.i.am featuring Britney Spears – "Scream & Shout"
2013 Mayra Verónica – "Ay Mama Mia"
2013 Stacey Jackson – "Pointing Fingers"
2013 Asher Monroe – "Here With You"
2013 Laura laRue – "Free Love"
2013 Juanes – "Cumbia Sexy"
2013 Plumb – "Need You Now"
2013 Ciara – "Body Party"
2013 Selena Gomez – "Come & Get It"
2013 Matthew Koma – "One Night"
2013 Irina – "One Last Kiss"
2013 Stefano Pain featuring Lucia – "Somewhere In The Sky"
2013 Luciana – "U B The Bass"
2013 LeAnn Rimes – "Spitfire"
2013 LeAnn Rimes – "You Ruined Me"
2013 Yoko Ono – "Walking On Thin Ice"
2013 Ikon and Exodus featuring Sisely Treasure – "Shadow of the Sun"
2013 Colette Carr – "Never Gonna Happen"
2013 Asher Monroe – "Hush Hush"
2013 YLA featuring Vanessa Hudgens – "$$$EX"
2013 Havana Brown – "Flashing Lights"
2013 Meital – "Give Us Back Love"
2013 Pet Shop Boys – "Love Is A Bourgeois Construct"
2013 Pearl Future – "I Can't Get Enough Of You"
2013 Celine Dion – "Loved Me Back to Life"
2013 LeAnn Rimes featuring Rob Thomas & Jeff Beck  – "Gasoline & Matches"
2013 Vassy – "Mad"
2013 Erasure – "Gaudete"
2013 Noelia – "Mind Blown"
2013 Alla Ray – "On Fire"
2013 My Crazy Girlfriend – "Go F**k Yourself"
2013 Kimberly Davis – "With You"
2013 Sage The Gemini featuring Iamsu! – "Gas Pedal"
2013 Lea Michele – "Cannonball"
2013 FAKY – "Better Without You"
2013 Mel B – "For Once In My Life"
2014 Basstoy Presents Dana Divine - "Runnin'"
2014 Starling Glow – "We Are Infinite"
2014 Starling Glow – "Ignite"
2014 Baker – "Not Gonna Wait"
2014 Lena Katina – "Lift Me Up"
2014 Five Knives – "The Rising"
2014 Britney Spears – "Body Ache"
2014 Asher Monroe featuring Chris Brown – "Memory"
2014 ZZ Ward – "Last Love Song"
2014 Enrique Iglesias featuring Pitbull – "I'm a Freak"
2014 Havana Brown – "Warrior"
2014 Scarlett Rabe – "Battle Cry"
2014 Juanes – "La Luz"
2014 Zedd featuring Matthew Koma and Miriam Bryant – "Find You"
2014 Beyoncé – "Partition"
2014 Idina Menzel – "Let It Go"
2014 London Rose – "Kick Drum"
2014 Nadia Forde – "Love is in the Air"
2014 Phunk Investigation – "Sax Shop"
2014 The McClymonts – "Here's To You & I"
2014 (We Are) Nexus – "Shamelessly"
2014 Anise K and Lance Bass featuring Bella Blue – "Walking on Air"
2014 Amy Grant – "Baby Baby"
2014 Ariana Grande featuring Iggy Azalea - "Problem"
2014 Röyksopp and Robyn - "Do It Again"
2014 Chris Willis and Joachim Garraud - "One Life"
2014 Hilary Duff - "Chasing the Sun"
2014 Shara Strand - "RSVP"
2014 Harlee featuring Akon - "Dream Warriors"
2014 Bastille - "Bad Blood"
2014 Dirty Loops - "Hit Me"
2014 ONO - "Angel"
2014 G.R.L. - "Ugly Heart"
2014 (We Are) Nexus - "Better Off Without You"
2014 RAC featuring Matthew Koma - "Cheap Sunglasses"
2014 Chris Brown featuring Usher and Rick Ross - "New Flame"
2014 Cherry Cherry Boom Boom - "A Little Bit Of Love"
2014 Sariah - "Aware, Alive, Awake"
2014 Nikkole - "Zero"
2014 Tinashe - "Pretend"
2014 Gia - "World"
2014 Ella Henderson - "Ghost"
2014 OneRepublic - "I Lived ([RED]) Remix"
2015 Selena Gomez - "The Heart Wants What It Wants"
2015 Noelia featuring Timbaland - "Spell"
2015 Ivy Levan - "Biscuit"
2015 Kelly Clarkson - "Heartbeat Song"
2015 Katy Tiz - "Whistle (While You Work It)"
2015 Marlon Roudette - "When The Beat Drops Out"
2015 ONO - "Woman Power"
2015 Malea - "One Hot Mess"
2015 Dirty Disco featuring Debby Holiday - "Lift"
2015 Mark Ronson featuring Bruno Mars - "Uptown Funk!"
2015 Skylar Stecker - "Rooftop"
2015 David Gray featuring LeAnn Rimes - "Snow In Vegas"
2015 Jessica Sutta featuring Rico Love - "Let It Be Love"
2015 Nathan Sykes - "Kiss Me Quick"
2015 Five Knives - "Savages"
2015 Starling Glow - "Caution Tape"
2015 Morgan Page featuring Lissie - "Open Heart"
2015 Ryan Skyy featuring Niki Darling - "Done"
2015 Rachel Platten - "Fight Song"
2015 Shelter featuring Frankmusik - "With U"
2015 Breanna Rubio - "More Than a Felling"
2015 Aggro Santos featuring Andreea Banica - "Red Lips"
2015 Nick Jonas - "Teacher"
2015 Paul Oakenfold featuring Tawiah - "Lonely Ones"
2015 Demi Lovato - "Cool for the Summer"
2015 Claire Rasa - "All I Wanted"
2015 KC and the Sunshine Band - "I Love You More"
2015 Rita Ora featuring Chris Brown - "Body On Me"
2015 Linnea - "Turning Away"
2015 Paris Hilton - "High Off My Love"
2015 Bleona - "Take You Over"
2015 Cœur De Pirate - "Carry On"
2015 Nytrix - "Take Me Higher"
2015 Lucas Nord featuring Tove Lo - "Run On Love"
2015 One Direction - "Drag Me Down"
2015 Prince Royce featuring Jennifer Lopez and Pitbull - "Back It Up"
2015 StoneBridge and Jamie Lee Wilson - "Out Of Nowhere"
2015 Mylène Farmer and Sting - "Stolen Car"
2015 PHASES - "I'm In Love With My Life"
2015 Nelly featuring Jeremih - "The Fix"
2015 Lady Gaga - "Til It Happens to You"
2015 Adele - "Hello"
2016 Mack Z - "I Gotta Dance"
2016 Claire Rasa - "Take Me Back"
2016 M.E.L - "Jealous"
2016 Shawn Hook - "Sound of Your Heart"
2016 Nikki Jumper - "Sinful Youth"
2016 Rachel Platten - "Stand By You"
2016 Inas X - "Love Is"
2016 Romina and Christiano Jordano - "Insane"
2016 Steve Grand - "We Are the Night"
2016 Alexa Aronson featuring Snoop Dogg - "Music Feels Better"
2016 Jonas Blue - "Fast Car"
2016 Merlin Moon - "Believe"
2016 Nick Martin featuring Lauren Bennett - "Reality"
2016 Dirtyfreqs and Vassy - "T.U.T.P (Turn up the Party)"
2016 Janice Grace - "Save the Planet"
2016 Billie Ray Martin - "Glittering Gutter"
2016 Erika Jayne - "How Many F**ks?"
2016 After Romeo - "Good Things"
2016 ZAYN - "Like I Would"
2016 Enrique Iglesias feat Wisin - "Duele el Corazón"
2016 Eva Swan - "Supreme"
2016 Malea - "Earth Angel"
2016 We the Kings - "The Story of Tonight"
2016 Salt Ashes - "Save It"
2016 Zack Zilla - "Don't Stop"
2016 Broadway for Orlando - "What the World Needs Now Is Love"
2016 Fitz and the Tantrums - "HandClap"
2016 Olivia Holt - "Phoenix"
2016 Amber Skyes - "Warning Sign"
2016 LÉON - "Tired of Talking"
2016 The Chainsmokers featuring Halsey - "Closer"
2016 Fergie - "M.I.L.F. $"
2016 Kristii - "Recovery"
2016 Tony Moran feat Jason Walker - "Say Yes"
2016 Plumb - "Smoke"
2016 John Legend - "Love Me Now"
2016 J Sutta - "Distortion"
2016 ONO - "Hell in Paradise"
2016 LeAnn Rimes - "Long Live Love"
2017 Nytrix - "Love Never Died"
2017 Sander Kleinenberg featuring DYSON - "Feel Like Home"
2017 Alexa Aronson - "Hide & Seek"
2017 Rebecca Black - "The Great Divide"
2017 Sting - "I Can't Stop Thinking About You"
2017 Krewella - "Team"
2017 JoLivi - "Love Who You Wanna Love"
2017 Little Mix - "Touch"
2017 Urban Cone - "Old School"
2017 Sting - "50,000"
2017 Malea - "You'll Never Fix My Heart"
2017 LeAnn Rimes - "Love Is Love Is Love"
2017 Rasmus Faber Featuring Linus Norda - "We Laugh We Dance We Cry"
2017 Skylar Stecker - "Only Want You"
2017 Jennifer Hudson - "Remember Me"
2017 JoAnna Michelle - "Too Sophisticated"
2017 Aggro Santos - "Bomba"
2017 Enrique Iglesias featuring Descemer Bueno, Zion and Lennox - "Súbeme La Radio"
2017 Nick Jonas featuring Anne Marie and Mike Posner - "Remember I Told You"
2017 DJ Khaled featuring Rihanna and Bryson Tiller - "Wild Thoughts"
2017 Nick Caster - "Ride All Night"
2017 The Chainsmokers - "Honest"
2017 Smash Mouth - "Walkin' on the Sun"
2017 Tim Myers - "Lover My Love"
2017 Emily Perry - "Boom"
2017 The Mavericks - "Brand New Day"
2017 Luis Fonsi and Daddy Yankee (featuring Justin Bieber) - "Despacito"
2017 OBB - "Mona Lisa"
2017 Kesha (featuring The Dap-Kings Horns) - "Woman"
2017 Kwaye - "Sweetest Life"
2017 The Trash Mermaids - "Cryptic Love"
2017 Kelly Clarkson - "Love So Soft"
2017 Jimmy D. Robinson and A Flock Of Seagulls - "Pedro"
2017 LeAnn Rimes - "Love Line"
2017 April Diamond - "Lose Control"
2017 Azure - "Too Late"
2017 Niall Horan - "Too Much To Ask"
2017 Skylar Stecker - "Blame"
2018 Demi Lovato - "Tell Me You Love Me"
2018 Kendra Erika - "Sublime"
2018 WesT - "Personal"
2018 Keala Settle - "This Is Me"
2018 Sting and Shaggy - "Don't Make Me Wait"
2018 The Trash Mermaids - "Xperiel"
2018 Sophie Simmons - "Black Mirror"
2018 Bleona - "Wicked Love"
2018 RABBII - "Majestic"
2018 Johnnie Mikel - "Friday Night"
2018 Ashley Brinton - "Trouble"
2018 The Heroic Enthusiasts - "New York Made Me"
2018 Bass Machina - "Overwhelmed"
2018 Hilary Roberts - "There For You"
2018 Plumb - "Beautifully Broken"
2018 Luciana and Nytrix - "Trouble"
2018 CliQ featuring Alika - "Wavey"
2018 Noah Cyrus and MAX - "Team"
2018 Sting and Shaggy - "Gotta Get Back My Baby"
2018 John Palumbo featuring ONO - "Hey Mr. President"
2018 LeAnn Rimes - "How Do I Live"
2018 Backstreet Boys - "Don't Go Breaking My Heart"
2018 The Rua - "All I Ever Wanted"
2018 Blair St. Clair - "Call My Life"
2018 Lizzo - "Boys"
2018 JJ Thornhill - "Take Me Back (All the Way Up)"
2018 Caroline Kole - "What If"
2018 Andreas Moss - "Deep Down Below"
2018 Bleona - "I Don't Need Your Love"
2018 for KING & COUNTRY  - "joy."
2018 Diana Ebe - "Chasing"
2018 OBB - "Is This A Thing"
2018 Plumb - "Crazy About You"
2018 LeAnn Rimes - "Joy"
2018 Alexander Stewart - "Enamorado"
2018 Barbra Streisand - "Don't Lie to Me"
2018 Drew Schiff - "It's Just Today"
2018 Dion Todd - "Remedy For Insanity"
2018 Christine Gordon - "Tidal Wave"
2018 Christine Gordon - "Refill"
2018 Pentatonix with Maren Morris - "When You Believe"
2018 Bright Lights featuring Fito Blanko - "Gringa"
2019 Sabrina Carpenter - "Sue Me"
2019 Sting and Shaggy - "Just One Lifetime"
2019 Reiji Kawaguchi featuring Marty James - "R.O.C.K.M.E."
2019 Tania - "Break Up To Make Up"
2019 Bleona - "Monster"
2019 Broke Royals - "Bad Chemicals"
2019 Sara Bareilles - "Fire"
2019 Majesty - "Wasted"
2019 OBB - "7 Billion"
2019 Céline Dion - "Flying on My Own"
2019 Temmora featuring Karma - "Fire"
2019 Shaggy featuring Jessi Alexander Stewart - "You"
2019 Kalendr x Laura Bryna - "Sweet Revenge"
2019 Marie-Mai - "Oser Aimer"
2019 XIMXIA - "Don't Follow Me"
2019 Nicole Markson - "Higher Than Heaven"
2019 Maren Morris - "The Bones"
2019 Veronica Vega featuring Quavo - "A Million"
2019 SHAED - "Trampoline"
2019 Kelsea Ballerini - "Miss Me More"
2019 Izzy Escobar - "No Boys"
2019 Starr - "Red"
2019 Alexander Stewart - "Backwards"
2020 Alya - "American Beauty"
2020 Carys - "Princesses Don't Cry"
2020 Andreas Moss featuring Sinclair - "Chaka Khan"
2020 Sub-Radio - "Better Than That"
2020 Sara Bareilles - "No Such Thing"
2020 Betty Reed - "Drunk On You"
2020 Guarika featuring Sean Kingston - "I'm Alive"
2020 Hilary Roberts - "Good Man"
2020 Melanie Pfirrman, Pitbull & IAmChino - "Suda"
2020 BlissBliss - "What's Going On?"
2020 Lindsay Lohan - "Back to Me"
2020 Sting - "Don't Stand So Close To Me"
2020 Toni Braxton - "Dance"
2020 Nicole Markson - "This Is My House"
2020 Barbara Mandrell - "Sleeping Single in a Double Bed"
2020 Laura Bryna - "Stars Are Falling"
2020 The Killers - "Caution"
2020 Maddie & Tae - "Die from a Broken Heart"
2020 Josey Greenwell - "Cowboy"
2020 Reba McEntire - "Fancy"
2020 HeatedXchange - "Outbreak"
2020 Cassadee Pope - "Rise and Shine"
2020 LeAnn Rimes - "The Right Kind Of Wrong"
2020 LeAnn Rimes - "But I Do Love You"
2020 LeAnn Rimes - "Can't Fight the Moonlight"
2020 LeAnn Rimes - "Please Remember"
2020 JP Saxe - "A Little Bit Yours"
2021 Chrissy Metz - "Feel Good"
2021 LeAnn Rimes - "Throw My Arms Around The World"
2021 Christina Grimmie - "Back To Life"
2021 Laura Pausini - "Io sì (Seen)"
2021 Demi Lovato featuring Ariana Grande - "Met Him Last Night"
2021 Laura Bryna - "The Way That It Was"
2021 Dierks Bentley - "Black"
2021 Brooke Eden - "Got No Choice"
2021 Reba McEntire - "I'm Gonna Take That Mountain"
2021 Reba McEntire - "Why Haven't I Heard From You"
2021 Shab featuring Martinez Twins - "Music To My Heart"
2021 Clayton Anderson - "Run Wild"
2021 Benjamin J. Alexander Presents - Clap, Clap https://vimeo.com/657639519
2021 Kid Moxie - "Big In Japan"
2021 Walker Hayes - "Fancy Like"
2021 Nikkole - "All Mine"
2021 Kaitlyn Dorff - "In My Dreams"
2021 Cody Belew - "Hang Your Hat on My Christmas Tree"
2021 Alx Luke - "Neon Lights"
2021 Tobey Kai - "Aftermath"
2021 LP - "One Last Time"
2022 Jessie James Decker - "Break My Heart"
2022 Noa Kirel - "Thought About That"
2022 Loud As Funk - "Friyay"
2022 Jeff Timmons featuring Pompey - "Lit"
2022 Lynda Carter - "Human And Divine"
2022 Nakia - "Unstoppable"
2022 Wyn Starks - "Who I Am"
2022 LeAnn Rimes - "spaceship"
2022 Pat Premier - "I just want (dance, dance, dance)"
2023 Idina Menzel - "Love Power"

References

Discographies of American artists
House music discographies
Electronic music discographies